Nepenthes sanguinea (from Latin sanguineus "blood red") is a large and vigorous Nepenthes pitcher plant species, native to Peninsular Malaysia and southernmost Thailand, where it grows at 300–1800 metres (1000 to 6000 feet) altitude. The pitchers are variable in size, from 10–30 cm (4 to 12 inches) tall, and range from green and yellow to orange and red. The insides of the pitchers are usually speckled with its two main colors. It was introduced to Victorian Britain around 1847 by Cornish plant hunter and botanist Thomas Lobb via the Veitch Nurseries.

Cultivation
This highland pitcher plant can be grown on a windowsill or in partly shaded areas outside, as well as in a terrarium, provided that it is large enough to accommodate this Nepenthes.

Natural hybrids
? N. albomarginata × N. sanguinea
 N. macfarlanei × N. sanguinea
 N. ramispina × N. sanguinea

References

Further reading

 [Anonymous] 1881. Messrs. Veitch's Nepenthes-house. The Gardeners' Chronicle, new series, 16(410): 598–599.
 [Anonymous] 1887. Nepenthes culture. The Gardeners' Chronicle, series 3, 2(41): 442–443.
 Bauer, U., C.J. Clemente, T. Renner & W. Federle 2012. Form follows function: morphological diversification and alternative trapping strategies in carnivorous Nepenthes pitcher plants. Journal of Evolutionary Biology 25(1): 90–102. 
 Bourke, G. 2003.  Carniflora Australis (2): 23–26.
 Burbidge, F.W. 1882. Notes on the new Nepenthes. The Gardeners' Chronicle, new series, 17(420): 56.
 Clarke, C.M. 2006. Introduction. In: Danser, B.H. The Nepenthaceae of the Netherlands Indies. Natural History Publications (Borneo), Kota Kinabalu. pp. 1–15.
 Clarke, C. & C.C. Lee 2012. A revision of Nepenthes (Nepenthaceae) from Gunung Tahan, Peninsular Malaysia. Gardens' Bulletin Singapore 64(1): 33–49.
 Dixon, W.E. 1889. Nepenthes. The Gardeners' Chronicle, series 3, 6(144): 354.
 Macfarlane, J.M. 1914. Family XCVI. Nepenthaceæ. [pp. 279–288] In: J.S. Gamble. Materials for a flora of the Malayan Peninsula, No. 24. Journal & Proceedings of the Asiatic Society of Bengal 75(3): 279–391.
  Mansur, M. 2001.  In: Prosiding Seminar Hari Cinta Puspa dan Satwa Nasional. Lembaga Ilmu Pengetahuan Indonesia, Bogor. pp. 244–253.
 Moore, D. 1872. On the culture of Nepenthes at Glasnevin. The Gardeners' Chronicle and Agricultural Gazette 1872(11): 359–360.
 Masters, M.T. 1872. The cultivated species of Nepenthes. The Gardeners' Chronicle and Agricultural Gazette 1872(16): 540–542.
 Meimberg, H., A. Wistuba, P. Dittrich & G. Heubl 2001. Molecular phylogeny of Nepenthaceae based on cladistic analysis of plastid trnK intron sequence data. Plant Biology 3(2): 164–175. 
  Meimberg, H. 2002.  Ph.D. thesis, Ludwig Maximilian University of Munich, Munich.
 Meimberg, H. & G. Heubl 2006. Introduction of a nuclear marker for phylogenetic analysis of Nepenthaceae. Plant Biology 8(6): 831–840. 
 Meimberg, H., S. Thalhammer, A. Brachmann & G. Heubl 2006. Comparative analysis of a translocated copy of the trnK intron in carnivorous family Nepenthaceae. Molecular Phylogenetics and Evolution 39(2): 478–490. 
 Renner, T. & C.D. Specht 2011. A sticky situation: assessing adaptations for plant carnivory in the Caryophyllales by means of stochastic character mapping. International Journal of Plant Sciences 172(7): 889–901. 
 Ridley, H.N. 1909. Nepenthaceæ. [p. 59] In: The flora of the Telôm and Batang Padang valleys. Journal of the Federated Malay States Museums 4(1): 1–98.
 Ridley, H.N. 1915. Nepenthaceæ. [pp. 168–169] In: XIII. The botany of Gunong Tahan, Pahang. Journal of the Federated Malay States Museums 6: 127–202.
 Santiago, Y. & D.W. Darnowski 2012. Mycorrhizal formation by various carnivorous plants. Carnivorous Plant Newsletter 41(1): 4–7.
  Schmid-Hollinger, R. N.d. Kannendeckel (lid). bio-schmidhol.ch. 
 Shivas, R.G. 1983.   Carnivorous Plant Newsletter 12(3): 65–67.
 Shivas, R.G. 1984. Pitcher Plants of Peninsular Malaysia & Singapore. Maruzen Asia, Kuala Lumpur.
 Shivas, R.G. 1984.  Carnivorous Plant Newsletter 13(1): 10–15.
 Thorogood, C. 2010. The Malaysian Nepenthes: Evolutionary and Taxonomic Perspectives. Nova Science Publishers, New York.
 Wan, A.S., R.T. Aexel, R.B. Ramsey & H.J. Nicholas 1972. Nepenthaceae: sterols and triterpenes of the pitcher plant. Phytochemistry 11(1): 456–461. 
 Yeo, J. 1996. A trip to Cameron Highlands. Bulletin of the Australian Carnivorous Plant Society, Inc. 15(3): 17–18.
 Nepenthes of Peninsula Malaysia by Stewart McPherson

External links

 Danser, B.H. 1928. 40. Nepenthes sanguinea LINDL. In: The Nepenthaceae of the Netherlands Indies. Bulletin du Jardin Botanique de Buitenzorg, Série III, 9(3–4): 249–438.

Carnivorous plants of Asia
sanguinea
Flora of Peninsular Malaysia
Flora of Thailand